Different Gear, Still Speeding is the debut studio album by English rock band Beady Eye, released on 28 February 2011. It debuted at number three in the UK Albums Chart selling 66,817 in the first week. As of August 2012, the album has sold 174,487 copies in the UK. On Different Gear, Still Speeding, all members contributed to the instrumentation, much like the later albums of Oasis.

Reception

Reviews of the album have been generally mixed-to-favourable. According to review aggregator site Metacritic, the album has an average score of 65%.

Reviewing for Rolling Stone, Stacey Anderson, who gave the album 2.5 out of 5 stars, said "On Different Gear, the band attempts stripped down, Stones-y rock but ends up with 'Be Here Now'-style guitar bluster and Liam's blithely boilerplate lyrics". Drowned in Sound awarded the album 4/10 saying that "By and large it radiates the stolid competence of a band on auto-pilot, with a few flashes of likeable enthusiasm." The Independent on Sunday gave it 2/5 stars. Simon Goddard, reviewing for Q, gave the album four-out-of-five stars and described it as "the strongest record Liam's made" since (What's the Story) Morning Glory?, while Garry Mulholland, in his three-star review for Uncut, denied that the album "remotely matches" Definitely Maybe, but felt the album was a step in the right direction. Mojo also gave the album four stars out of five, citing Gallagher's singing as a highlight. The Fly, however, remarked that the album was "dull", and a disappointment, while Scotland on Sunday added that Noel Gallagher is missed as a songwriting partner. The BBC and The Independent both commented that the album bests Oasis' later music, if not lacking innovation from the previous group, while The Sun praised the album's simplicity and variety, citing "Bring the Light" as a surprising highlight, a comment that NME repeated. The album is generally agreed to have surpassed expectations, with Mojo remarking that the album "shaped up better than many imagined," and Q saying that it "decimates all negative preconceptions."

Track listing

iTunes Bonus Tracks

Japanese Edition 

Special edition
There is a special edition of the album, which includes a DVD with music videos for "Bring the Light", "Four Letter Word" and "Sons of the Stage", as well as a documentary entitled RAK Them Out. Japanese copies included the music video for "The Roller". A Japan-only "Limited Tour Edition" includes a bonus DVD featuring highlights from the concert in Paris on 13 March 2011, containing twelve songs in 52 minutes, and music videos including "The Beat Goes On".

Personnel
Personnel per booklet.

Beady Eye
 Liam Gallagher – vocals, acoustic guitar
 Gem Archer – lead guitar, piano, bass guitar, backing vocals
 Andy Bell – rhythm guitar, bass guitar, backing vocals
 Chris Sharrock – drums
Additional musicians
 Victoria Akintola, Nomvula Malinga – backing vocals on "Bring the Light" and "Kill for a Dream"

Production
 Beady Eye, Steve Lillywhite – producers
 Beady Eye, Jonathan Shakhovskoy – mixing
 Jonathan Shakhovskoy – engineer
 Helen Atkinson – recording assistance
 Rich Cooper – mixing assistance
 John Davis – mastering
 Steve Gullick – photography
 Lawrence Watson – photography
 Paul 'Spooner' Heywood – photography
 Paul Heywood – photography
 House@Intro – album art

Charts

Weekly charts

Year-end charts

As of January 2012 UK sales stand at 165,864 copies according to The Guardian.

Certifications

Release history

References

External links
 Different Gear, Still Speeding – on Rdio 
 Different Gear, Still Speeding – on Spotify
 
 
 
 
 

2011 debut albums
Albums recorded at RAK Studios
Albums produced by Steve Lillywhite
Beady Eye albums